Divna Ljubojević, sometimes called by just her first name,  Divna, is a Serbian singer and conductor of Orthodox Christian sacred music in various languages. She is the conductor and artistic director of the Melodi ensemble, a "choir and studio for spiritual music". which she founded with a group of her friends.

Lykourgos Angelopoulos, professor at the School of Byzantine Chant at the Conservatory of Athens, and the founder and director of the Greek Byzantine Choir, has described her as having one of the purest voices he has ever heard.

Early life 
Ljubojević was born in 1970 in Belgrade, Serbia, then part of the Socialist Federal Republic of Yugoslavia.
She studied at the Mokranjac Music School and later graduated from the Academy of Arts at the University of Novi Sad in Novi Sad.
From the age of ten, she was trained in singing by the sisters of  Vavedenje (Serbian: , Presentation of the Holy Theotokos) monastery, near Belgrade. She developed a unique style derived from Karlovatz singing.

Career 
In 1988, the eighteen-year-old Ljubojević began conducting the Mokranjac choir. Between 1989 and 1991 she conducted the First Belgrade Singing Society, founded in 1853, as the youngest conductor in its history. Ljubojević has been also an active teacher of church and choral singing in France, the Netherlands and England. In 1991, she founded the Melodi ensemble, composed of 10 singers. Today, Ljubojevic and Melodi are popular performers, touring worldwide but mostly in Eastern and Western Europe, where they have given more than 600 concerts.

Selected Discography
 Local releases 
  – i.e. Axion Estin, Vavedenje Monastery, 1996
  – i.e. Axion Estin, Vavedenje Monastery, 1999
  – i.e. Zoodochos Pege, Vavedenje Monastery, 2000
  – i.e. Melodi, Vavedenje Monastery, 2001
  – i.e. Doxology, Vavedenje Monastery, 2002
  – i.e. Liturgy in Vavedenje Monastery (Divine Liturgy of St. John Chrysostom), 2004
  – i.e. Concerts, 2006
  – i.e. Christ has risen, 2007
  – i.e. Christ is born, Vavedenje Monastery, 2008
  – i.e. The Mirror, 2008
 International releases
 Mystères Byzantins – i.e. Byzantine Mysteries, 2004
 La Divine Liturgie de Saint Jean Chrisostome – i.e. The Divine Liturgy of St. John Chrysostom, 2005
 Divna en concert. Théâtre des Abbesses, Paris – i.e. Divna in concert. Abbesses Theatre, Paris, 2006
 La Gloire de Byzance – i.e. The Glory of Byzantium, with Lykourgos Angelopoulos and the Greek Byzantine Choir, 2006
 Lumières du Chant Byzantin – i.e. Lights of Byzantine Chant, 2008
 Éternel Byzantin – i.e. Eternal Byzantine, 2009
 L'âme du chant orthodoxe – i.e. The Soul of the Orthodox Chant, 2011
 In Search of Divine Light'', Valley Entertainment 2014 

Third party releases
 FACT 253 – DJ Mix, by Current 93 – track 5:  Agne Parthene, 2011

See also
Dragoslav Pavle Aksentijević

Notes and references
Notes

References

External links
We Sing to You – Divna Ljubojevic
The official YouTube channel of Divna Ljubojevic & "The Melodists" Choir
Divna & Melόdi official profile at Facebook
Artist page at AllMusic

1970 births
Living people
21st-century Serbian women singers
20th-century Serbian women singers